Scleropactidae is a family of woodlice, with a predominantly Gondwanan distribution. It contains the following genera:

Adinda Budde-Lund, 1904 (18 species)
Amazoniscus Lemos de Castro, 1967 (6 species)
Aulaconiscus Taiti & Howarth, 1997 (monotypic)
Caecopactes Schmidt, 2007 (monotypic)
Circoniscus Pearse, 1917 (10 species)
Colomboniscus Vandel, 1972 (3 species)
Colomboscia Vandel, 1972 (5 species)
Globarmadillo Richardson, 1910 (monotypic)
Globopactes Schmidt, 2007 (6 species)
Haplarmadillo Dollfuss, 1896 (monotypic)
Heptapactes Schmidt, 2007 (monotypic)
Kithironiscus Schmalfuss, 1995 (2 species)
Matazonellus Juarrero de Varona & de Armas, 1996 (2 species)
Microsphaeroniscus Lemos de Castro, 1985 (5 species)
Neosanfilippia Brian, 1957 (2 species)
†Palaeospherarmadillo Broly, 2018 (2 species)
Paratoradjia Ferrara, Meli & Taiti, 1995 (4 species)
Protoradjia Arcangeli, 1955 (5 species)
†Protosphaeroniscus Schmalfuss, 1980 (monotypic)
Richardsoniscus Vandel, 1963 (monotypic)
Scleropactes Budde-Lund, 1885 (10 species)
Scleropactoides Schmidt, 2007 (4 species)
Sphaeroniscus Gerstaecker, 1854 (5 species)
Spherarmadillo Richardson, 1907 (4 species)
Suarezia Budde-Lund, 1904 (2 species)
Toradjia Dollfus, 1907 (4 species)
Troglopactes Schmidt, 2007 (monotypic)
Xeroporcellio Strouhal, 1954 (monotypic)

References

Woodlice
Crustacean families